Bad Münstereifel-Iversheim station is a railway station in the Iversheim district of the municipality of Bad Münstereifel, located in the Euskirchen district in North Rhine-Westphalia, Germany.

References

Railway stations in North Rhine-Westphalia
Buildings and structures in Euskirchen (district)